The Wales Millennium Centre is an arts centre located in the Cardiff Bay area of Cardiff, Wales. Phase 1 of the building was opened during the weekend of 26–28 November 2004 and phase 2 opened on 22 January 2009 with an inaugural concert. 

The Centre is Cardiff's principal receiving venue for large-scale opera, ballet, contemporary dance and musicals. From 2013 it became a producing company in its own right.

The Wales Millennium Centre (WMC) comprises a large theatre and two smaller halls with shops, bars and restaurants. It houses Wales' national orchestra and opera, dance, theatre and literature companies, a total of eight arts organisations in residence. 
  
The main theatre, the Donald Gordon Theatre, has 2,497 seats, the BBC Hoddinott Hall 350 and the Weston Studio Theatre 250.

In 2001 Lord Rowe-Beddoe was appointed chairman of Wales Millennium Centre, a company limited by guarantee. Board members include Sir Michael Checkland.

Background

The failed Cardiff Bay Opera House project

The Wales Millennium Centre replaced an earlier project for the site, the Cardiff Bay Opera House, a plan supported by the Cardiff Bay Development Corporation to construct a permanent home for the Welsh National Opera. The project failed to win financial support from the Millennium Commission, the body which distributed funds from the UK National Lottery.

An international design competition attracted 268 international applicants, and was won by Iraq-born architect Zaha Hadid. Her avant-garde design was so radical that she and a selection of other applicants were asked to submit revised designs for a second round of competition—which she again won with "a sleek and dazzling complex of sharp lines and surfaces that she compared to an 'inverted necklace'".

In December 1995, the Millennium Commission decided against lottery funding for the project. It was suggested that the bid failed because of "the unpopular Conservative government's fear of controversy", favouring the funding of projects perceived as more populist, such as the Millennium Stadium.

Origins of the Wales Millennium Centre 
After the Cardiff Bay Opera House project was rejected, a new project was conceived that included more than opera and was felt to be a better reflection of Welsh culture. The change of name symbolised this, but the project still had to overcome many hurdles. Funding from the Welsh Assembly and Millennium Commission took years to obtain. Cardiff Council had to buy the land after the previous owners, Grosvenor Waterside (the property division of Associated British Ports) threatened to build a retail centre there due to the delays. Further boosts were given by large donations from South African businessman Donald Gordon and a loan from the international bank, HSBC. The £20 million donation from Donald Gordon was split evenly between the Royal Opera House and Wales Millennium Centre and was spread over five years. This is believed to be the largest single private donation ever made to the arts in the UK.

Phase 1 – Donald Gordon Theatre and Weston Studio Theatre 

In addition to the two main theatres of the Donald Gordon Theatre and Weston Studio Theatre, the  phase 1 of the Wales Millennium Centre has six function rooms: the Victor Salvi Room, the David Morgan Room, the Sony Room, the Seligman Room, the Japan Room, and the Lloyds Enterprise Suite. The Urdd Gobaith Cymru has a hostel with overnight accommodation for 153 people in en-suite bedrooms, called the Urdd City Sleepover.
It also has performance and teaching space in the Urdd Hall/Theatre, with 153 retractable seats.

The building also includes rehearsal rooms, orchestral facilities for the Welsh National Opera, dance studios for Diversions, called the Dance House, and the Blue Room, with seating for up to 100.

The foyer has three bars; the Penderyn Awen Foyer Bar on level 2, the Horizons Foyer Bar on level 4, and the Stones Foyer Bar on level 5. Ffresh restaurant is also situated in the foyer, along with the coffee shop Crema, the ice cream parlour Hufen and the wine bar One. Free performances also take place during the day in the foyer on the Glanfa Stage.

Design and construction 

The WMC was designed by Jonathan Adams of local practice Percy Thomas Architects (taken over by Capita Group in 2004), with Arup Acoustics providing the acoustic design and Arup as building engineer. His first concept drawings were made in early 1998, and by 1999 his design had started to look more like the building it is today.

Construction began on 25 February 2002. The main contractor was Sir Robert McAlpine Ltd, Kelsey Roofing Industries Ltd was the roofing contractor, and Carr and Angier were theatre consultants. Other contractors included Stent (foundations), Swansea Institute of Higher Education, now part of University of Wales Trinity Saint David (glass), GH James Cyf (stonemasonry), Rimex (stainless steel), Alfred McAlpine (slate), Coed Cymru (wood), Ann Catrin Evans (door furniture) and Amber Hiscott (etchings on glass walls). 

The architect's concept was a building that expressed "Welshness" and was instantly recognisable. The building was designed to reflect many different parts of Wales with local Welsh materials that dominate its history: slate, metal, wood and glass. Many of the materials used come from Wales, including 1,350 tonnes of Welsh slate. 300,000 concrete blocks and a million metres of electric cable were also used in construction.

Slate

The exterior of the building is clad in multi-coloured slate collected from Welsh quarries. Narrow windows are built into the layers of slate to give the impression of rock strata in sea cliffs. The purple slate came from the Penrhyn Quarry, the blue from Cwt y Bugail Quarry, the green from the Nantlle Valley, the grey from Llechwedd quarry, and the black from the Corris Quarry.
I always loved going to Ogmore and Southerndown. I thought the cliffs there looked like a building anyway. A building capable of withstanding the roughest weather for hundreds of years. The older they get, the better they look. I wondered if it would be possible to make a building which had the same qualities as these magnificent cliffs. To do that I needed a lot of stone. Normal stone for buildings has to be specially cut into blocks; it takes a long time to make and costs a fortune. But in north Wales the historic slate industry has left behind whole mountains of waste stone that no-one wants. This was stone cut from the mountainside for nearly two hundred years but which wasn't good enough to make roof slates. Over 90% was thrown away. But it was ideal for making walls like the one I had in mind... —architect Jonathan Adams

Metal

The WMC's main feature, the bronze coloured dome which covers the Donald Gordon Theatre, is clad in steel that was treated with copper oxide. It was designed to withstand the weather conditions on the Cardiff Bay waterfront and to look increasingly better with age. The architect, Jonathan Adams, decided not to use copper and aluminium as they would both change colour with age and weather conditions.
We all know that steel making has been important to south Wales, just as slate making has changed the landscape of the north. We have to use a special type of steel that won't go rusty near to the salt-laden, maritime air of Cardiff Bay. This stainless steel will be made near to Pontypool. For the Wales Millennium Centre I thought it was important that the materials should have a "natural" texture, and that they should be instantly recognisable to anyone seeing them, even from a distance. For this reason I felt it was important that the steel of the shell should have the rough grain and the riveted pattern that we think of as more typical of old industrial structures, such as those that used to be commonplace around the landscape of the industrial south. —Jonathan Adams

Wood

Both the inside and outside of the building – including the main Donald Gordon Theatre, the balconies and the rear of the building – are dominated by bands of hardwood lining the walls.

Like the exterior of the building, the principal internal spaces are designed to make the best use of natural materials in their natural state. The structure and detail of the concourse galleries echo the form of the exterior, with the curving strata formed in native hardwoods. Oak, ash, beech, sycamore, alder, birch, chestnut and cherry woods from renewable sources in mid-Wales will be used together in proportions that reflect their relative availability from the forest. The design of the concourse galleries is intended to evoke the image of the edge of the forest, partly as a counterpoint to the coastal nature of the exterior, and partly because the edge of the forest in folklore and mythology represents a line between the real world and the magical world, a line which resembles the front edge of the theatre stage. The form of trees is created by the interweaving curvature of the gallery edges, and by the random positioning of the supporting columns. —Jonathan Adams

Glass

Glass was used to incorporate into the bands of slate. Glass is not used in the contemporary British architectural style of the glass curtain.

Jonathan Adams said, "The glass veins in the external walls of the Wales Millennium Centre make use of conventional glass in a unique way: the sheets of glass are stacked together and fused in a kiln to form solid blocks."

Calligraphy

 

Inscribed on the front of the dome, above the main entrance, are two lines written by Welsh poet Gwyneth Lewis in the Welsh and English languages. The lettering is formed by windows in the upstairs bar areas and is internally illuminated at night.

The idea of this monumental inscription comes from Roman classical architecture. The Romans brought Christianity to these islands, along with the custom of engraving stone. The form of the Celtic cross embodies the cross-fertilisation of indigenous and Roman cultures, from which the Welsh nation first emerged. The monumental inscription is a familiar feature of Roman architecture. The inscription over the entrance of the Wales Millennium Centre is a revival of this classical tradition, and also a recognition of the formative influence of Roman culture upon our nation. We're lucky to have two languages; one that we share with half the world and one which belongs just to us. Words in songs, stories and poems have helped to make Wales the proud country that it is. —Jonathan Adams

Gwyneth Lewis said of the inscription:

I wanted the words to reflect the architecture of the building. Its copper dome reminded me of the furnaces from Wales's industrial heritage and also Ceridwen's cauldron, from which the early poet Taliesin received his inspiration ('awen'). Awen suggests both poetic inspiration and the general creative vision by which people and societies form their aspirations. [...] It was important to me that the English words on the building should not simply be a translation of the Welsh, that they should have their own message. The strata of the slate frontage of the Wales Millennium Centre reminded me of the horizons just beyond Penarth Head. The sea has, traditionally, been for Cardiff the means by which the Welsh export their best to the world and the route by which the world comes to Cardiff. The stones inside the theatre literally sing with opera, musicals and orchestral music, and I wanted to convey the sense of an international space created by the art of music. —Gwyneth Lewis

In These Stones Horizons Sing is also an orchestral work, composed by Karl Jenkins and commissioned by the Wales Millennium Centre for the building's opening.

Opening weekend ceremony 
The building was officially opened on the weekend of the 26, 27 and 28 November 2004. Bryn Terfel organised the ceremony and was the creative director of the weekend.

Day 1 – 26 November 2004

The day started with a speech from WMC chairman Lord Rowe-Beddoe, who declared that the proceedings were under way. This was followed by a speech from Rhodri Morgan, the First Minister, who stressed that the new arts centre belonged to the whole nation, that it was for all of the people of Wales and not just for the elite.

The building was opened by Janet Thickpenny, a young mother from Barry, who was chosen because her 40th birthday coincided with the opening day. A human chain delivered the symbolic key, designed and cast by Ann Catrin Evans, to Janet. This was accompanied by a fanfare from the National Youth Brass Band of Wales to Karl Jenkins' specially commissioned work In These Stones Horizons Sing, and the Wales Millennium Centre was open.

The evening celebrations began with Cymru for the World, which celebrated the achievements of five leading Welsh artists; Gwyneth Jones, Shirley Bassey, Siân Phillips, Alun Hoddinott and Richard Burton, represented by his daughter Kate Burton. This included tributes from Robert Hardy, Jonathan Pryce, Derek Jacobi, Nana Mouskouri, Catrin Finch, Ruth Madoc and Ian McKellen. The concert was directed by Ken Caswell and conducted by David Charles Abell.

Bryn Terfel started with a short speech and introduced the WMC singers and dancers, who in hard hats and donkey jackets sang and danced the story of the building's construction. They were later joined by all 322 participants in a chorus, including Gwyn Hughes Jones and Bryn Terfel. Dennis O'Neill sang a duet from Pearl Fishers. Diversions performed a new ballet based on one of Alun Hoddinott's works. The Welsh National Opera performed the final scene of Beethoven's Fidelio in their new home. The evening ranged included many types of music, from popular to classical.

Day 2 – 27 November 2004

On the second day, the doors opened for the public to explore the building. A continuous stream of people filled through the building during the day, which concluded with a fireworks display in the Roald Dahl Plass.

Day 3 – 28 November 2004

The final day of the opening weekend began with the arrival of Queen Elizabeth II, Prince Philip and the Prince of Wales, who met First Minister Rhodri Morgan and Lord Rowe-Beddoe, and marked the event by unveiling a plaque. A key was presented to the Queen by Richard Burton's granddaughter, Charlotte Frances Ritchie. Philip Madoc, Siân Phillips, Gaby Roslin, Michael Ball, Charlotte Church, Catrin Finch and Only Men Aloud! were among the artists that entertained the audience during the first act. The second act was opened by the Welsh National Opera and later the Kirov Ballet and Cirque Éloize entertained the audience. Bryn Terfel ended the celebrations.

Awards
 2005 Gold Medal for Architecture at the National Eisteddfod of Wales
2005 RIBA Wales award
 2005 MIPIM Awards (Hotels & Tourism resorts)   
 Sustainability and Environmental Impact award from the British Institute of Facilities Management
 2005 Interior of the Year award from FX

Phase 2 (C Bay) – BBC Hoddinott Hall 

Phase 2 of the Wales Millennium Centre is home to the BBC National Orchestra of Wales (BBC NOW) and the BBC National Chorus of Wales. BBC NOW moved from Studio 1 at Broadcasting House in Llandaff, which the orchestra had outgrown since the late 1960s. Phase 2 opened on 22 January 2009 with an inaugural concert performed by the BBC NOW and conducted by Thierry Fischer. Phase 2 includes the 350-seater BBC Hoddinott Hall, also known simply as Hoddinott Hall, which is named after the late Welsh classical composer Alun Hoddinott (11 August 1929 – 12 March 2008), and the Grace Williams Studio, which is named after another Welsh composer, Grace Williams (19 February 1906 – 10 February 1977), and is used as a centre for education and outreach work. Phase 2 also has space for practice rooms, a music library and backstage facilities, and provides a four-storey office space for Wales Millennium Centre and the Arts Council of Wales.

Design and construction

The original plans for the WMC were that it would have a concert hall, but the final design of phase 1 did not include one. Instead, space was left for a concert hall to be built after phase 1 opened in 2004, and construction on phase 2 was then due to begin early in 2005. However, phase 2 construction did not actually begin until April 2007. Phase 2 was designed to fit into the WMC's curved slate frontage, with an upper part constructed from timber.

Phase 2 of the WMC was designed by the then newly qualified Tim Green and Keith Vince of Capita Architecture, formerly called Capita Percy Thomas and now part of Capita Symonds, with Arup Acoustics again providing the acoustic design. The main contractor was again Sir Robert McAlpine Ltd, with MJN Colston Ltd responsible for the design and installation of all the mechanical, electrical and public health services in the building. Other subcontractors on the project included URS Corporation, Davis Langdon and Hulley & Kirkwood.

Tim Green said that the exterior of phase 2 was designed to be in keeping with phase 1, while the interior had its own theme, that of a traditional Welsh chapel. He said that "The timber treatment at low level is very reminiscent of Victorian chapels and the masonry above. The stonework you would normally get in a stone chapel has been replaced by concrete." 
 
During the design and construction period, the project name for phase 2 was C Bay. Construction began in April 2007. It ended when the keys to the building were handed over at an official ceremony in September 2008, and BBC Wales began to fit out the interior of the Hoddinott Hall.

Opening Festival
To commemorate the opening of the BBC Hoddinott Hall, an inaugural concert took place on 22 January 2009. It was part of an Opening Festival which took place between 22 January and 1 February 2009. The concert was performed by the BBC National Orchestra of Wales and was conducted by Thierry Fischer. It included the world premiere of St Vitus in the Kettle by Simon Holt, the orchestra's composer in association, who took over from Michael Berkeley. The BBC Hoddinott Hall was officially opened by the Prince of Wales on 31 January 2009, where he unveiled a plaque.

Awards
 Engineering Excellence Award from the Association for Consultancy and Engineering.
 2009 Special Award: Best Use of Panel Products from the Wood Awards

Resident organisations 

The Wales Millennium Centre is home to nine arts organisations:

 Literature Wales – Welsh national literature promotion agency and society for writers
 National Dance Company Wales – previously known as Diversions
 Hijinx Theatre – a theatre company that promotes community work, aiming to bring together people of all ages
 Touch Trust – providing educational touch and movement therapies to people with profound disabilities and autism
 Tŷ Cerdd – music information centre for amateur and professional musicians, including the Welsh Music Information Centre, Welsh Amateur Music Federation, National Youth Arts Wales and Cyfansoddwyr Cymru (Composers of Wales)
 Urdd Gobaith Cymru (the Welsh League of Youth) – Welsh language youth movement
 Welsh National Opera – an international touring opera company
 BBC National Orchestra of Wales – the only professional national symphony orchestra for Wales
 Arts Council of Wales – the body responsible for funding and developing the arts in Wales

Corporate financing and rebranding 

The total cost of phase 1 of the project was £106.2 million. The National Lottery Millennium Fund provided £31.7 million, a further £37 million came from The National Assembly for Wales and £10.4 million was donated by the Arts Council of Wales. In addition, a private investor, South African businessman Donald Gordon, donated £20 million to be shared equally between the Royal Opera House and the Wales Millennium Centre. WMC also received a £13.5 million loan from HSBC. The remaining funds for the project came from a major sponsorship deal with the Principality Building Society. The Weston Studio is named after the Garfield Weston Foundation which funds the Glanfa Stage, and is located on Level 1 of the building. Many other corporations and public bodies provide sponsorship to WMC.

The National Assembly for Wales announced on 6 November 2007 that it was to pay off the outstanding loan of £13.5 million from HSBC and also increase its annual funding. From April 2008, the Assembly gave an annual grant of £3.5 million to the WMC for 3 years. This was intended only to repay the capital debt and not any ongoing operating loss as the organisation remained profitable. The money came from unallocated funds from the Assembly's previous budget and the then Minister for Heritage, Rhodri Glyn Thomas, said that it would not come at the expense of other art projects in Wales.

The cost of phase 2 of the project was approximately £18 million. The BBC does not own the building, but has leased it for 25 years from the Lime Property Fund, a subsidiary of Aviva Investors. Phase 2 was built by Concert Bay Ltd, a subsidiary of Sir Robert McAlpine Enterprises Ltd, which co-funded the scheme along with Lime Property Fund.

In November 2006, WMC announced that it would begin a two-phase rebranding project. The project was won by a local Cardiff company, Sweet. The first phase of the project involved a new corporate logo; the second phase included the redesign of other marketing tools, such as brochures and advertisements.

In popular culture 
Doctor Who and Torchwood

WMC has made numerous appearances in film and television, including in Doctor Who, whose modern era is produced locally by BBC Wales. It has appeared seven times to date: as itself from outside in the episode "Boom Town"; its marquee momentarily at the end of the episode "Bad Wolf"; its lobby as a hospital lobby in the far future in the episode "New Earth", and again in "The Girl Who Waited"; and briefly in the episodes "Utopia", "The Stolen Earth" and "Last of the Time Lords".

The spin-off series Torchwood has its headquarters, known as "The Hub", set underneath the Water Tower in Roald Dahl Plass, with the WMC's frontage featuring heavily through the show.

Jones Jones Jones

On 3 November 2006, a record-breaking attempt to gather the most people with the same surname, Jones, took place at WMC under the show banner Jones Jones Jones, filmed for television by S4C. The record was broken with 1,224 Joneses filling the Donald Gordon Theatre. The previous record was set in Sweden in 2004 when 583 people gathered who had the same surname of Norberg.

Gavin & Stacey

Episode 1 of the second series of the BBC TV show Gavin & Stacey was filmed in the Wales Millennium Centre. The centre was supposed to be an airport.

References
Notes

External links 

 
Wales Millennium Centre on the BBC Wales website
Cardiff Bay Visitor Centre
Wales Millennium Centre on the Welsh Assembly Government website
Wales Millennium Centre (phase 1) on the Sir Robert McAlpine website
BBC Hoddinott Hall (phase 2) on the Sir Robert McAlpine website
C Bay (BBC Hoddinott Hall phase 2) on the MJN Colston website
Jonathan Adams, architect, discusses the Wales Millennium Centre
Hoddinott Hall on the Architects' Journal website
Arup

Arts centres in Cardiff
Buildings and structures completed in 2004
Buildings and structures celebrating the third millennium
Music venues in Cardiff
Opera houses in Wales
Dance venues in Wales
Landmarks in Cardiff
Tourist attractions in Cardiff
Percy Thomas buildings
Exhibition and conference centres in Wales
BBC Cymru Wales
Theatres in Cardiff
Performing arts centres in Wales
2004 establishments in Wales